Polina Stanislavovna Khan (born December 31, 1999) is a Russian taekwondo athlete. She won the bronze medal at the 2018 European Taekwondo Championships on the women's 67 kg weight category.

References 

1999 births
Living people
Russian female taekwondo practitioners
Sportspeople from Rostov-on-Don
European Taekwondo Championships medalists
Russian people of Korean descent
21st-century Russian women